Leonard Smart was a footballer who played for Folkestone Town, Wolverhampton Wanderers, Port Vale, and Bournemouth & Boscombe Athletic.

Career
Smart played for Folkestone Town and Wolverhampton Wanderers, before joining Port Vale in March 1939. He only spent two months at The Old Recreation Ground, and scored five goals in 13 Third Division South appearances. His first two goals for the "Valiants" came in a 4–2 win over Cardiff City at Ninian Park on 11 March, and he also bagged goals against Bristol Rovers, Notts County, and Newport County. He later played for Bournemouth & Boscombe Athletic.

Career statistics
Source:

References

English footballers
Association football wingers
Folkestone F.C. players
Wolverhampton Wanderers F.C. players
Port Vale F.C. players
AFC Bournemouth players
English Football League players
Year of birth missing
Year of death missing